San Pablo is a church in Zaragoza, Spain. Its original Gothic-Mudéjar building dates to the late 13th/early 14th-century; later it was enlarged and modified several times.

History
The original 14th-century edifice had a single nave with four bays with vaults and flying buttresses, with chapels, ending with a transept and a pentagonal apse.

In 1343 a Mudéjar tower was added, originally near the entrance, but now enclosed in the main body of the building. In the 15th century, two aisles were built.

Later, until the 18th century, several chapels were opened on the right side, the front and the back of the church.

Overview
The Gothic portal (15th century) has  a varied sculptural decoration, featuring images of Saint Peter and Saint Paul on the jambs, and of Christ seated between the Virgin, Saint John and Saint Blaise on the tympanum.

The tower has an octagonal plan, and, like the church, is made in brickwork, part of which are decorated. The lower section is not visible from the exterior, as it is currently embedded within the church: it has an Arab-style frieze. The upper floors have Mudéjar-style decorations, mullioned windows and small arcades. At the top is a pyramidal spire.

The reredos (retablo) of the main altar, in gilded and polychrome wood, was executed by Damián Forment (1515–1518).

Conservation
In 1931 the church was designated a monumento nacional.

In 2001 the church was included in the World Heritage Site Mudéjar Architecture of Aragon.

Sources

Pablo
Gothic architecture in Aragon
Mudéjar architecture in Aragon
Museums in Zaragoza
14th-century Roman Catholic church buildings in Spain
14th-century establishments in Spain
Bien de Interés Cultural landmarks in the Province of Zaragoza
World Heritage Sites in Spain